The Rape of Europa is a 1643 painting by Jacob Jordaens (1593–1678), now in the palais des Beaux-Arts de Lille. He also produced a more erotic earlier (1615–1616) version, now in the Gemäldegalerie, Berlin.

References

1643 paintings
Paintings by Jacob Jordaens
Paintings of Europa (consort of Zeus)
Paintings in the Gemäldegalerie, Berlin
Paintings in the collection of the Palais des Beaux-Arts de Lille